Etty Bay is a coastal town and a locality in the Cassowary Coast Region, Queensland, Australia.

Attractions
Etty Bay is a popular beach for locals and tourists. It features a swimming net to protect from the seasonal Jelly Fish. Etty bay also has a prominent cassowary population that can be regularly seen on the beach.

History 

Education 
There are no schools in Etty Bay. The nearest government primary school is Mourilyan State School in neighbouring Mourilyan to the south-west. The nearest government secondary school is Innisfail State College is Innisfail Estate, Innisfail, to the north-west.

References

External links 
 

Towns in Queensland
Cassowary Coast Region
Coastline of Queensland
Localities in Queensland